Overseas military bases of the United Kingdom enable the British Armed Forces to conduct expeditionary warfare and maintain a forward presence. Bases tend to be located in or near areas of strategic or diplomatic importance, often used for the build-up or resupply of military forces, as was seen during the 1982 Falklands War and the use of RAF Ascension Island as a staging post. Most of the bases are located on British Overseas Territories or former colonies which retain close diplomatic ties with the British government.

Apart from the main operating bases, the British military has personnel stationed at approximately 145 overseas military installations located across 42 countries. Most of these are small contingents. However, some sixty facilities are run directly by the British Armed Forces, including seventeen installations in Cyprus. Allied countries host British military personnel in some sixty-nine facilities, including in Oman, at sixteen locations, and Saudi Arabia, where there are fifteen. Six of the countries with a fixed UK military presence are featured on the Foreign and Commonwealth Office's list of 30 'Human Rights Priority Countries': Bahrain, Iraq, Saudi Arabia, Somalia, Syria and Yemen.

A number of British military operations have relied heavily on the strategic island of Diego Garcia in the Chagos Islands. It has been used for major operations during the War on Terror, Operation Granby (1991), Operation Herrick (2001–2014), Operation Telic (2003–2011), Operation Shader (2014–present), Operation Desert Storm (1991), Operation Desert Fox (1998), Operation Enduring Freedom (2001–14), Operation Iraqi Freedom (2003–11), and Operation Inherent Resolve (2014–present).

Overview
Whilst the Ministry of Defence has publicly stated that the British Armed Forces only operates military bases in the UK, the United States, Cyprus, Gibraltar and the South Atlantic, a November 2020 report by Declassified UK journalist Phil Miller revealed that there were in fact a total of 145 military sites that spanned all seven continents. These figures were revealed in the wake of UK Prime Minister Boris Johnson announcing a £16.5 billion increase in the country's defence budget.

The 145 sites include 60 which the UK operates itself, as well as a further 85 run by British allies. According to Miller, these appear to fit the description of what Mark Carleton-Smith, the Chief of the General Staff, referred to as "lily pads", i.e. sites which the British Armed Forces have easy access to as and when they are required.

Bases by continent

Africa
In Africa, British troops are present in Djibouti, Kenya, Malawi, Mali, Nigeria, Sierra Leone and Somalia. There are five bases/training facilities in Kenya, including the Kifaru Camp, which is part of the BATUK at the Kahawa Barracks in Nairobi.

In the Chagos Islands, the British and American military jointly operate the Naval Support Facility Diego Garcia. The command's mission is "[t]o provide logistic support to operational forces forward deployed to the Indian Ocean and Persian Gulf AORs in support of national policy objectives." The facility started construction in 1971 and was complete by 1976, becoming operational the very same year. Despite the fact that it is technically owned by the Ministry of Defence, the facility is primarily occupied by U.S. Navy elements.

Antarctica
The British Rothera Research Station is located on Antarctica. HMS Protector supplies the civilian scientific research station and patrols nearby waters, including those around the South Georgia and the South Sandwich Islands.

Asia
There are sixty-one sites in Asia where British military personnel have been reported to be present. Most of these are in the Arab states of the Persian Gulf, like Saudi Arabia, which is home to fifteen sites, and Oman, which has sixteen of them. There are two sites in the United Arab Emirates and one main base, the United Kingdom Naval Support Facility, in Bahrain. There is also a two-man squad at the Embassy of the United States in Jerusalem. These two soldiers are understood to assist the work of Mark C. Schwartz, the US security coordinator for Israel and the Palestinian Authority. Schwartz uses the embassy as his headquarters.

In Sembawang of Singapore, there is British Defence Singapore Support Unit which is operated by Royal Navy and could be positioned as the logistic centre and supporting base of British Armed Forces in Southeast Asia, East Asia and Oceania. Brunei hosts one battalion of the Royal Gurkha Regiment and a supporting helicopter unit.

Oceania
Australia is host to four sites where British personnel are present: the Wyndham aerodrome in Western Australia, Williamtown in New South Wales, Woomera and Mawson Lakes, both in South Australia. According to a Declassified UK report, the British military also has around 60 personnel stationed across the country. Around 25 of these hold defence attaché roles in the British High Commission in Canberra and at Australian Defence Department sites near the capital, such as the Headquarters Joint Operations Command at Bungendore.

A further ten British military personnel are based at unspecified locations in New Zealand. Parliamentary data from 2014 showed their roles included working as navigators on a P-3K Orion aircraft, which is operated by the Royal New Zealand Air Force.

Europe
The British military operates seventeen military facilities in two "sovereign base areas" on Cyprus, Akrotiri and Dhekelia, which are host to 2,290 British personnel. There are also four bases in Germany and one in the British Crown Dependency of Jersey, Lithuania, Estonia and the Czech Republic.

The Americas
The British military has troops stationed in six U.S. states including California (Edwards Air Force Base), Nevada (Creech Air Force Base) and South Carolina (MCAS Beaufort).

As British Overseas Territories, the Turks and Caicos Islands, Montserrat, Bermuda and the Cayman Islands have all established locally-recruited units which are reserve components of the British Army. The most recently established of these is the Turks and Caicos Islands Regiment, which was officially raised in April 2020.

RAF Mount Pleasant is the largest of six sites in the Falkland Islands, which is the only territory in South America with British military personnel. Mount Pleasant is  supplied from a dockyard at Mare Harbour. The islands are monitored by three radar sites at Mount Alice, Byron Heights and Mount Kent, respectively.

Significant Overseas Military Deployments

The British Armed Forces maintain a number of larger garrisons and military facilities around the world:

Locally raised units of British Overseas Territories

Six British Overseas Territories also maintain their own locally raised units for home defence and security:

See also
 Power projection
 List of countries with overseas military bases
 List of Royal Navy shore establishments
 List of British Army installations
 List of Royal Air Force stations
 List of United States military bases

References

External links
 James, W. (2021). "Global Britain's strategic problem East of Suez." European Journal of International Security

 
Military of the United Kingdom
British Armed Forces deployments